Setidobhan is a village development committee in Syangja District in the Gandaki Zone of central Nepal. At the time of the 2011 Nepal census it had a population of 3098. The major centers within the VDC are Setidobhan, Rangethanti, Newabot, Krishi and Jugle. The VDC comprises total 10 wards.

References

External links
UN map of the municipalities of Syangja District

Populated places in Syangja District